The Military ranks of Trinidad and Tobago are the military insignia used by the Trinidad and Tobago Defence Force. Being a former colony of the United Kingdom, Trinidad and Tobago shares a rank structure similar to that of the United Kingdom.

Commissioned officer ranks
The rank insignia of commissioned officers.

Other ranks
The rank insignia of non-commissioned officers and enlisted personnel.

References

Trinidad and Tobago
Military of Trinidad and Tobago
Trinidad and Tobago and the Commonwealth of Nations